Princess Clementina is a 1911 British silent historical adventure film, directed and produced by William G.B. Barker. This film was based on a stage adaptation of the book Clementina by A.E.W. Mason.

Cast
 H.B. Irving as Charles Wogan	
 Alice Young as Princess Clementina
 Dorothea Baird as Jenny
 Eille Norwood as James Stuart
 Nigel Playfair as Prince of Baden
 Arthur Whitby as Harry Whittington
 Charles Allan as Cardinal Origo
 Henry Vibart as Major Richard Gaydon
 Frederick Lloyd as Captain John Missen

External links

1911 films
1910s historical adventure films
British black-and-white films
British historical adventure films
British silent short films
1910s British films
Silent historical adventure films
1910s English-language films